Dighori is a Village in the Lakhandur Taluka of Bhandara District of Maharashtra state in India.

Cities and towns in Bhandara district